Emtage is a surname. Notable people with the surname include:

Alan Emtage (born 1964), Barbarian-born Canadian computer scientist 
James Emtage (1902–1995), Barbadian cricketer

See also
Emptage